Rajendra Raut is an independent politician from Solapur district. He is Member of the Legislative Assembly from Barshi (Vidhan Sabha constituency) of Solapur District, Maharashtra, India. He was elected independent MLA in 2019.

Positions held
 2004: Elected as Member of Maharashtra Legislative Assembly (1st term)
 2019: Elected as Member of Maharashtra Legislative Assembly (2nd term)

See also
 Barshi Assembly Constituency
 Osmanabad Lok Sabha Constituency

References

External link
 Rajendra Raut

Living people
Shiv Sena politicians
Maharashtra MLAs 2019–2024
Marathi politicians
Year of birth missing (living people)